Joedson Almeida Santos, better known as Joedson, is a football midfielder revealed in the basic categories of Vitoria Bahia. He currently plays for Oeste.

Career
Was the red-black cast of Bahia until 2007, when he was defending Votoraty of. There he remained until mid-2009, when he returned to Bahia, to play for Fluminense de Feira. Was still in Victoria at the end of the season but returned to Bahia Flu in 2010. On August 24, 2010, the player was acquired from the Roosters. On 3 January 2011, he signed a contract with Sport Recife.

Career statistics
(Correct )

Honours
Campeonato Baiano - 2005 - Vitória
Campeonato Baiano - 2007 - Vitória

Contract
 Atlético Mineiro.
 Sport Recife.

See also
Football in Brazil
List of football clubs in Brazil

References

External links
 ogol.com
 soccerway
 sambafoot

1989 births
Living people
Brazilian footballers
Clube Atlético Mineiro players
Sport Club do Recife players
Oeste Futebol Clube players
Association football midfielders